Harold Lee "Rock" Royer (c. 1934 – November 20, 1973) was an American football coach best known for his role as the father of Liberty University football. He was the school's first ever head coach before dying in a plane crash while caught up in tornadic winds in his Cherokee 6 on November 20, 1973. He also was a noted Baptist evangelist and was known in collegiate football circles as "Coach Born Again".

Coaching career
Royer left the United States Naval Academy, where he had served as defensive coordinator, to start up the football program at Lynchburg Baptist College, now called Liberty University. He served as the school's first head coach leading the Flames to a 3–3 record including three straight victories to end the inaugural season. He also served as an assistant coach at Maryland and he spent two seasons early in his career as head coach at Pennsylvania Military College, now called Widener University.

Head coaching record

References

External links
  Royer Speech titled "Jerusalem or Jericho" delivered at 1973 Christian Education Association Convention - Published posthumously in The Projector, March 1974, p. 1

Year of birth missing
1930s births
1973 deaths
American evangelists
American football fullbacks
American football linebackers
Boston College Eagles football coaches
Liberty Flames football coaches
Maryland Terrapins football coaches
Navy Midshipmen football coaches
UConn Huskies football coaches
Virginia Tech Hokies football coaches
West Chester Golden Rams football coaches
Widener Pride football coaches
High school football coaches in Pennsylvania
People from Ridley Township, Pennsylvania
Sportspeople from Delaware County, Pennsylvania
Players of American football from Baltimore
Coaches of American football from Pennsylvania
Players of American football from Pennsylvania
Victims of aviation accidents or incidents in 1973
Victims of aviation accidents or incidents in the United States